Christos Papoulias (born 17 June 1998) is a  Greek middle-distance and long-distance runner. Since December 2016 he has competed for Panathinaikos.
Papoulias was born in Athens. He is the son of former track and field athlete Panagiotis Papoulias and has a brother, Anestis Papoulias, who is also a runner.

References

1998 births
Living people
Greek male long-distance runners
Panathinaikos Athletics
Athletes from Athens